Undermatching is a phenomenon in American higher education in which well-qualified school-leavers, often from less affluent households, are not matched with competitive colleges. Undermatched students attend less-demanding colleges such as two-year colleges or don't attend college at all.

Undermatching is considered as a serious issue in higher education, and it is getting increased attention from education researchers and policymakers. Undermatching can affect long-term economic inequality and social mobility, and it can negatively affect college graduation rates. According to one view, minority and less-affluent students have substantially lower graduation rates and take longer on average to get degrees when they do stay in school. Low college graduation rates are a problem in the United States; one estimate is that fewer than 60% of high school graduates manage to earn a bachelor's degree, which is one of the worst completion rates of developed nations. The problem of undermatched students has attracted the attention of the executive branch. Proposals to reduce undermatching include making it easier to transfer between colleges, making financial aid policies more transparent, and helping students identify colleges that will challenge them academically, possibly by sending high-achieving low-income seniors an information packet about college choices. According to a report by NBC News in 2014, some elite colleges such as Williams strive actively to bring bright low-income students by supporting them financially but these colleges can find themselves pressed to make up the shortfall by seeking out more full-paying students; as a result, students at such colleges tend to be mostly affluent with some low-income students but few from the middle class, which reporter Nona Willis-Aronowitz described as a "middle class squeeze".

While estimates vary, the numbers of undermatched students in the United States are considerable. One estimate is that only a third of high-achieving students from the bottom quartile of income distribution attended any of the 238 "most selective" colleges. Another estimate is that 28% of college students are undermatched and could have attended a more rigorous institution, while 25% may be overmatched or "over their heads". An overall estimate is that each year there are 400,000 low-income well-qualified high school graduates who do not enroll in college, and that there are an additional 200,000 who are in college but undermatched. Many undermatched students are African-American or Latinos, and generally come from poor or less affluent backgrounds. Researchers studying undermatching have noticed that undermatched students are more likely to report fewer self-perceived gains from their education, and have less educational satisfaction on average, although they had more frequent meetings with faculty and were more likely to participate in collaborative learning projects, according to one study. They are less likely on average to graduate from college.

Undermatching is generally not believed to be caused by discriminatory policies by college admissions offices but rather by a lack of applications by well-qualified students. Simply put, high-qualified low-income students do not apply to colleges they are qualified for. Lack of information about choices and scholarships may be a factor, as well as basic financial constraints. This includes misperceptions about costs; many undermatched applicants are deterred by the artificially high sticker prices by elite colleges without realizing there are numerous opportunities for financial aid.

See also
 College admissions in the United States
 Higher education in the United States

References

Higher education in the United States
Poverty in the United States
Economic inequality